Castiarina insculpta, the Miena jewel beetle, is a species of beetle in the jewel beetle family, Buprestidae. It is endemic to Tasmania, where it feeds on the asteraceous shrub Ozothamnus hookeri.

References

insculpta
Endemic fauna of Tasmania
Beetles described in 1934